The  is a limited express train service operated by West Japan Railway Company (JR West) between  and  in Ishikawa Prefecture, Japan, via the IR Ishikawa Railway Line and Nanao Line since 14 March 2015.

Service outline

The name, meaning "Noto bonfire", is intended to evoke an image of the bonfires and torches that form part of the summer festivals on the Noto Peninsula.

Rolling stock
The services use 681 series and 683 series EMUs.

Formations
Trains are generally formed as shown below, with car 1 at the Wakura-Onsen (northern) end. All cars are no-smoking.

History
The name of the new train services was officially announced by JR West's Kanazawa Division on 7 October 2014.

See also
 List of named passenger trains of Japan

References

External links
 JR West press release (October 2014) 
 Service outline 

Named passenger trains of Japan
Railway services introduced in 2015
West Japan Railway Company
2015 establishments in Japan